Tomek is a Polish-language masculine given name, a diminutive of Tomasz. It may also serve as a surname.

The name may refer to:

Given name

Tomek Baginski (born 1976), a Polish illustrator, animator and director
Tomek Bartoszyński (born 1957), Polish-American mathematician who works in set theory
Tomek Bork (born 1952), Polish actor, working in the United Kingdom since the early 1980s
Tomek Iwan (born 1971), Polish former professional footballer
Tomek Makowiecki (born 1983), Polish musician, singer and songwriter
Tomek Valtonen (born 1980), Polish-born Finnish former professional ice hockey forward
Tomek Wilmowski, series of nine youth adventure novels written by Polish author Alfred Szklarski

Fictional characters
Tomek from Kasia i Tomek a Quebec comedy television series
Tomek Ovadya Morah or T. O. Morrow, comic book supervillain published by DC Comics

Surname
 Ferdinand Frederick Tomek, the namesake of the F. F. Tomek House, an example of Frank Lloyd Wright's prairie house
  (1818–1905) – Czech historian
  (1912–2001) – Czech-Austrian painter

  (born 1942) – Czech historian

 Ellen Tomek (born 1984), American rower
 Martin Tomek (born 1969) – Czech football goaltender

 Tomáš Tomek (born 1988), Slovak ice hockey player

See also
 Tomášek
 Tomíček

Polish masculine given names
Czech-language surnames
Slovak-language surnames